is a Japanese amateur astronomer and discoverer of minor planets.

He lives in Kitami on the island of Hokkaidō in northern Japan, where he observes asteroids and comets at the Kitami Observatory. Takahashi is a member of the local astronomy club "Hokkaidō Suisei Shōwakusei Kaigi" (北海道彗星・小惑星会議).

With his colleague Kazuro Watanabe, he is credited by the Minor Planet Center with the co-discovery of 22 minor planets between 1989 and 1991, including his lowest numbered discovery, the asteroid 4644 Oumu. Takahashi and Watanabe also discovered the inner main-belt asteroid 5214 Oozora in 1990, while working at Hokkaido Kitami Observatory. 5214 Oozora is named for Super Ōzora, the first express train in Hokkaidō.

At Watanabe's suggestion, the main-belt asteroid 4842 Atsushi, discovered by Seiji Ueda and Hiroshi Kaneda at Kushiro in 1989, was named in Takahashi's honor. Naming citation was published on 1 September 1993.

References 
 

20th-century Japanese astronomers
Discoverers of asteroids

Living people
Year of birth missing (living people)